Robert H. Meyer Memorial State Beach is a state beach of California, located in northern Malibu, Southern California. 
The park is part of the Santa Monica Mountains National Recreation Area.

Features
The park is made up of three small separate and distinct beach areas:
El Pescador Beach 
La Piedra Beach
El Matador Beach

Parking is atop the bluffs for each, with public access down to the coves and their beaches.

See also
 California coastal sage and chaparral ecoregion
 Natural history of the Santa Monica Mountains
List of beaches in California
List of California state parks

References

External links
Parks.ca.gov: Official Robert H. Meyer Memorial State Beach website — with maps.

California State Beaches
Beaches of Southern California
Malibu, California
Parks in Los Angeles County, California
Santa Monica Mountains National Recreation Area
Tourist attractions in Malibu, California
Beaches of Los Angeles County, California